IRIB Salamat (شبكه‌ی سلامت, Shibkâhey-e Salâmit, "Health Channel"), is an Islamic Republic of Iran Broadcasting television channel, broadcast in Worldwide.

The channel is one of the newer television channels in Iran and was established on September 26, 2012. The channel's 24-hour-a-day broadcast includes Health Programs.

External links

IRIB Salamat Live streaming

Television stations in Iran
Persian-language television stations
Islamic Republic of Iran Broadcasting
Television channels and stations established in 1994
Mass media in Tehran
1994 establishments in Iran